Alfred Hirsch (– ) was a German-Jewish athlete, sports teacher and Zionist youth movement leader, notable for helping thousands of Jewish children during the German occupation of Czechoslovakia in Prague, Theresienstadt concentration camp, and Auschwitz. Hirsch was the deputy supervisor of children at Theresienstadt and the supervisor of the children's block at the Theresienstadt family camp at Auschwitz II-Birkenau.

Because of his German extraction, charisma, and careful appearance, he was able to convince SS guards to grant privileges to the children, including exemptions from deportation and extra rations, which saved their lives at least temporarily. Hirsch and his assistants maintained clandestine education under the difficult circumstances. Hirsch's insistence on exercise, discipline, and strict hygiene reduced death rates among the children.

The family camp was due to be liquidated on 8 March 1944; Hirsch's popularity made him a natural leader for an uprising. According to some accounts, he committed suicide in order not to have to witness the deaths of his charges; alternately, he was poisoned by Jewish doctors who would have been killed if an uprising had broken out.

Early life

Germany 
According to Fredy's niece, Raquel Masel, his brother, Paul Hirsch (1914–1979), was not close to their mother because of her bitterness. Their poor relationship encouraged Fredy and Paul to join youth organizations. Both brothers attended the Aachener Couven-Gymnasium, which was not a Jewish school. Fredy left in March 1931 when his mother moved, but there is no evidence that he attended another school, and apparently he continued to live in Aachen. The Jewish community of Aachen was well-integrated; there was little antisemitism in Aachen before the Nazi Party came to power in 1933. Hirsch was already giving lectures at the age of 15.

Hirsch took over the leadership of the scouting branch of the local Aachen Jewish youth association in 1931, and participated in founding the Aachen branch of the Jüdischer Pfadfinderbund Deutschland (Jewish Scouting Association of Germany, JPD), a German Jewish scouting organization, in 1932. Later that year, Hirsch moved to Düsseldorf for a job with the JPD. The JPD had Zionist tendencies and a close affiliation with Maccabi Hatzair, a Zionist sporting association. Although Paul joined the JPD, he, like many in the Aachen Jewish community, believed in assimilating into the non-Jewish community. Fredy became an ardent Zionist, supporting the establishment of a Jewish state in then British Mandate of Palestine (now Israel).

Under the background of rising, state-sponsored antisemitism, the JPD training became increasingly militarized, emphasizing drills, marching with heavy loads, and first-aid training. In 1933, the JPD merged into Maccabi Hatzair. Hirsch moved to Frankfurt, where he shared a flat with leading JPD officials and led a scouting group. His time in Frankfurt was cut short by rumors that he was gay, based on his lack of a girlfriend and behavior towards some of the boys under his supervision, although he was not accused of inappropriate behavior or misconduct. He moved to Dresden in 1934, where he worked as a sports instructor for Maccabi Hatzair and probably attended lectures at the German College of Physical Education in Berlin.

Czechoslovakia 

After the passage of the Nuremberg Laws in 1935, Hirsch moved to Prague, Czechoslovakia, probably illegally. According to German historian , the author of the first biography of Hirsch, he may have also been motivated to escape the increasing persecution of gay men in Germany. He continued to work for Maccabi Hatzair. The Czech branch of the organization was initially concerned about his reputation, but Hirsch was able to persuade Arthur Herzog, chairman of Maccabi Hatzair in the Czech lands, that his homosexuality did not affect his work.

Between October 1936 and April 1939, Hirsch lived in Brno with his lover Jan Mautner, four years his senior and a medical student from Olomouc. Their relationship was well known in the city, according to Holocaust survivor Ruth Kopečková. Mautner and Hirsch published the Maccabi newspaper, Mautner translating Hirsch's articles into the Czech language, which Hirsch never mastered. Funded by the Zionist World Federation, Hirsch organized local Maccabi Games and set up youth and adult groups for physical education. He organized the 1937 Maccabi Games for Czechoslovakia held in Žilina, Slovakia, with 1,600 participants. Paul, a Reform rabbinical student, emigrated with their mother and her second husband to Bolivia in 1938; Paul eventually became a rabbi in Buenos Aires. Fredy could have accompanied them, but did not; Paul later said that Fredy's Zionist convictions had prevented him.

After Brno refused him a residence permit and threatened to expel him, Hirsch returned to Prague. Working at the Zionist Youth Aliyah School run by Egon Redlich, he organized hakhshara (preparation farms) for young Jews seeking to immigrate to the Land of Israel and live on a kibbutz, training youth in horticulture, agriculture, and basic military training. In late 1938, the Munich Agreement ceded the Sudetenland (German-speaking region of Czechoslovakia) to Germany; on 15 March 1939, Germany invaded Czechoslovakia, creating the Protectorate of Bohemia and Moravia. Assimilation of the Czech Jews was so high that many children were not even aware that they were Jews. Eighteen boys trained by Hirsch were able to escape to Denmark in October 1939, and immigrated to Palestine the following year. He drew lots with another Zionist youth leader as to which of them would go to Palestine with the boys; Hirsch lost and remained in Prague. In 1940, he was joined by Mautner, who was prevented from continuing his studies by the closure of the Czech universities. The same year, Hirsch published an article in the Prague Jewish Newspaper laying out his views on Jewish youth education; Hirsch viewed physical education as essential to promoting well-being and a Zionist consciousness.

Over time, the Germans applied more and more restrictions to Czech Jews; they were fired from their jobs, forced to move, had property confiscated, were forbidden from certain shops and streets, and eventually forced to wear the Star of David. After the Nazis banned Jews from public spaces, Hirsch organized a playground at Hagibor, in the Strašnice district of Prague, for Jewish children to exercise. Hirsch and Mautner held soccer matches, athletic competitions, study groups, and theatrical performances there. Although there were other carers, Hirsch's charisma made him the natural leader. Since he could not speak Czech well, he gave instructions in Hebrew and taught the children to speak that language. Survivors reported that Czech songs were written about him. In late 1941, the Nazis began deporting Czech Jews, first to the Łódź Ghetto.

The Holocaust

Theresienstadt 

Hirsch was one of the first Jews to be transported to Theresienstadt concentration camp on 4 December 1941, where he helped to construct the concentration camp. His friendship with Jakob Edelstein lead to an appointment with the housing department. Later, Hirsch became the deputy to Egon Redlich, the leader of the Youth Services Department; Redlich personally disliked Hirsch, but respected his competence and leadership ability. Mautner was also deported to Theresienstadt in early 1942. At Theresienstadt, the children lived separately from the adults. Based on the teachings of Zionist youth movements, Hirsch insisted on maintaining self-esteem, discipline, regular exercise and strict hygiene—even holding cleanliness competitions—in order to maximize their chances of survival. The youth leaders tried to maintain the children's education despite this being prohibited, teaching a wide range of subjects including Hebrew, English, mathematics, history, and geography. However, the Germans did not actively oppose his activities because they felt that it helped maintain order. Children 14 and older had to work; Hirsch tried to get them jobs working in the vegetable gardens because he believed that this work would improve their health and prepare them for life in Palestine.

Survivors often remarked on Hirsch's self-confident attitude, good looks, and careful appearance, which had a salutary effect on other prisoners. He paid attention to his posture and appearance, keeping his hair combed and boots polished, and reportedly continuing to pomade his hair at Auschwitz. Hirsch was able to establish a good relationship with SS guards even though he was Jewish and openly gay. According to Yehuda Bacon, "he spoke German as well as the Nazis, he had charm and a tip-top look. He knew how to talk to the SS. He was dressed like a soldier." Pavel Stránský, who had been an educator on the children's block at Auschwitz, testified that "[t]he SS treated him almost like a human being".

Redlich and Hirsch used their influence to arrange separate barracks and slightly better conditions for the children. Sometimes they were able to remove children from transports to extermination camps, although they were ultimately unable to save them from this fate; more than 99% of the children at Theresienstadt were eventually deported. Hirsch persuaded the Germans to allocate space for a play area inside the concentration camp, where he frequently oversaw athletic activities. In 1943, Maccabi Games were held and observed by thousands of spectators.

On 24 August 1943, a single transport of 1,200 children from the Białystok Ghetto arrived at Theresienstadt. These children were frightened of the showers because they believed that they were gas chambers. The Białystok children were housed in the western barracks, separated from the rest of the camp by a barbed-wire fence. Czech gendarmes guarded the perimeter and kept the children strictly segregated from the rest of the camp under threat of severe punishment. According to Kämper, Hirsch wanted to confirm the rumors that Jews deported from Theresienstadt were murdered in gas chambers. In any event, he managed to jump over the wire fence separating the Białystok children from the rest of the Theresienstadt prisoners, but he was caught and arrested by a Czech guard. Peter Erben believes that Hirsch could have avoided punishment if he had been able to speak Czech. Instead, he was brought to the commandant's office and beaten. Allegedly for this violation, he was deported to Auschwitz on 8 September.

Auschwitz 

The Jews from Theresienstadt encountered unprecedented privileged treatment upon their arrival, where they were established in a separate block (BIIb), known as the Theresienstadt family camp. They were tattooed, but were not subject to selection upon arrival, were allowed to retain their civilian clothes, and were not forced to shave their heads. Families stayed together and were also allowed to write to their relatives at Theresienstadt, to those not yet deported, and even to friends in neutral countries, in order to convey the impression that deportation to the east did not necessarily mean death.

Hirsch was appointed the lagerälteste of the family camp, because of the respect that the SS had for his leadership. He refused to use violence against other prisoners, as the Germans demanded. As a result, he was relieved of his position a month later and replaced by the German criminal Arno Böhm. However, he persuaded Böhm to allocate a barracks, Block 31, for children younger than fourteen, and became the overseer of this barracks. In this arrangement, the children lived with their parents at night and spent the day at the special barracks. Hirsch recruited adult prisoners who had been involved in education at Theresienstadt and persuaded the guards that it would be in their interest to have the children learn German. In fact, the teachers taught other subjects, including history, music, and Judaism, in Czech, as well as a few German phrases to recite at inspections. Because there were only twelve books and almost no supplies, the teachers had to recite lessons from memory. The children's lack of education—they had been excluded from school even before their deportation—made their task more difficult. A chorus rehearsed regularly, a children's opera was performed, and the walls of the barracks were painted with Disney characters by Dina Gottliebová. Because the block was so orderly, it was shown off to SS men who worked in other parts of the camp.  SS men who directly participated in the extermination process, especially Dr. Josef Mengele, visited frequently and helped organize better food for the children.

Using his influence with the Germans, Hirsch obtained better food for the children and food parcels addressed to prisoners who had died. The soup for the children was thicker than for other prisoners; allegedly it was from the Gypsy camp and contained semolina. The children's barracks also received additional coal and were slightly better heated. Hirsch also convinced the Germans to hold roll call inside the barracks, so the children were spared the hours-long ordeal of standing outside in all weather. After another transport arrived in December 1943, there were about 700 children in the family camp; Mautner was also on this transport. Zuzana Růžičková, who had also arrived in December, entered into the children's barracks without authorization in order to obtain work as a carer, but was caught by an SS man. To distract him, Hirsch reportedly said "Herr Oberscharführer, who have you killed and looted today?" Instead of beating Hirsch, the SS man offered him a cigarette, which Hirsch declined. Nevertheless, Hirsch was not excepted from the brutal treatment of the guards, being badly beaten when a boy slept through the roll call.

Hirsch persuaded Böhm to allocate a second barracks for children aged three to eight so that the older children could prepare a performance of Snow White, which the SS had requested. The play was performed on 23 January 1944 with many SS men in attendance. By imposing strict discipline on the children, Hirsch made sure that there were no acts of violence or theft, otherwise common in concentration camps. He was extremely strict about the children's hygiene, insisting that they wash daily even in the frigid winter of 1943–44 and carrying out regular inspections for lice. Due to Hirsch's efforts, the mortality rate for the children was nearly zero, compared to the overall mortality of about 25% of the residents of the family camp in the first six months. The children appreciated Hirsch's efforts on their behalf, and threw a surprise party for him on 11 February 1944, his 28th birthday. In February 1944, a delegation from the Reich Security Main Office and the German Red Cross visited the family camp. The visitors were most interested in the children's barracks, which was the only attempt to organize education at Auschwitz. The most notable visitor, Adolf Eichmann, commented favorably about the cultural activity of the children at Birkenau.

Death 

Arrivals to the family camp were marked "SB6"—a cryptic abbreviation that the resistance movement in Auschwitz eventually decoded as referring to Sonderbehandlung ("special treatment"). This meant that the arrivals were to be murdered 6 months after their arrival, or 8 March 1944 for the transport that Hirsch was on. Hirsch and other leaders from Theresienstadt were informed in advance by the resistance movement at Auschwitz. By this time, it was evident to the prisoners that the Germans were going to lose the war and some hoped for a swift Allied victory before their six months had elapsed. Although there was no possibility of success, many Jews wanted to set the compound on fire as a symbolic act of resistance. Hirsch was the natural leader for an uprising, because he was respected by opposing factions in the family camp. On 5 March, the September arrivals were told that they were soon to be transported to a labor camp at Heydebreck and instructed to write postcards dated 25 March for their relatives in Theresienstadt. On 7 March, they were moved to the quarantine block (BIIa); although warned in advance that the Nazis were planning to murder all of these Jews, Hirsch went with them.

What happened after this is unclear. Rudolf Vrba, the clerk of BIIa, visited Hirsch on 8 March to inform him about the preparations for the liquidation of the family camp and to urge him to lead an uprising. Apparently Hirsch was uncertain whether to believe the warnings about imminent death and skeptical of the value of resistance. He thought it was unreasonable that the Nazis would give them such favored treatment only to murder them later. Hirsch asked for an hour to think, and when Vrba returned, Hirsch was in a coma. A Jewish doctor told Vrba that Hirsch had committed suicide by a barbiturate overdose. If he did commit suicide, it is unclear how he could have obtained a lethal dose without the cooperation of the doctors.

According to some survivors, Hirsch requested a small dose of a tranquilizer to help him calm down, but the Jewish doctors poisoned him to prevent him from leading an uprising, which they feared would compromise their own chances of survival. Mengele had promised them that they would not be killed. The latter explanation is favored by Kämper. A few people, including doctors and the artist Dina Gottliebová, were spared from death by their special talents which were useful to the SS. According to survivor testimonies, Hirsch was to be spared, but he was unwilling to save himself without the children. On the night of 8 March, a strict curfew was imposed and the Jews in the quarantine blocks were loaded in trucks and driven to the gas chambers. Still unconscious, Hirsch was carried with them and was murdered along with many of the children under his supervision.

Legacy 
According to postwar testimonies, Hirsch was "a man of extraordinary courage" and  "for the children a God", although some of his adult colleagues dismissed him as arrogant, shallow, dictatorial, or vain. The gymnasium in Aachen that he attended renamed its cafeteria the "Fredy-Hirsch-AG" in 2016 to commemorate his 100th birthday. At a commemoration ceremony in the Aachen synagogue on the one hundredth anniversary of Hirsch's birth, Lord Mayor Marcel Philipp stated that Hirsch was "one of the most important sons of the city, if not the best known". Nina Weilová, who survived the Theresienstadt family camp as a young teenager, said that "There was no one who was so self-sacrificing and devoted himself to the children as much as he did." Czech Jewish harpsichordist Zuzana Růžičková worked as a teacher's assistant at the children's barracks at Auschwitz and credited Hirsch for saving her life. Many years later, she helped organize a monument for him. At the dedication, she said, "We Jews have no saints, but we have 'tzadikim'—the word could be translated as 'righteous' or 'decent'. Fredy Hirsch was a man, he had his faults, he was not a saint, but he was righteous—a tzadik—and so we hope that when the last of us who knew him have passed away, future generations will stand before this tablet and say: 'He must have been a good, brave and beautiful person'."

Hirsch was the subject of the 2016 documentary Heaven in Auschwitz, which featured the accounts of thirteen survivors of Theresienstadt and Auschwitz. He was also featured in the 2017 Israeli documentary "Dear Fredy" by Rubi Gat.

According to Dirk Kämper, Hirsch's role was marginalized after the war because of his homosexuality. In communist Czechoslovakia, his German ethnicity and Zionism made him an unacceptable hero. Historian Anna Hájková, investigating the relationship between Hirsch and Mautner, writes that theirs was "one of the rare queer life stories that can be reconstructed for the Nazi era". Hirsch is the rare exception to the absent or anonymous gay Holocaust victim because he worked with children and teenagers, who lived long enough to tell the truth about him. She also noted the lingering homophobia in the Terezín Initiative, the Czech association of Holocaust survivors, which refused to print an inquiry from her regarding their relationship. According to Hájková, "It is disturbing that even in 2018 the homosexuality of a Holocaust victim is considered to be offensive".

On February 11, 2021, Google celebrated his 105th birthday with a Google Doodle. The Doodle was displayed in Germany, Czechia, Slovakia and Israel.

See also 
 Persecution of homosexuals in Nazi Germany

References

Notes

Citations

Sources

Print

Web

Further reading

External links 

 
 
Primary source material on Hirsch in the collections of the Jewish Museum in Prague

1916 births
1944 deaths
People from Aachen
LGBT Jews
German Zionists
German Jews who died in the Holocaust
German people who died in Auschwitz concentration camp
Jewish sportspeople
Theresienstadt Ghetto prisoners
Czech resistance members
German resistance members
Jews in the German resistance
German LGBT sportspeople
German emigrants to Czechoslovakia
Gay sportsmen
20th-century LGBT people